Jennifer Gareis (born August 1, 1970) is an American actress and former beauty queen. She is best known for her roles as Grace Turner on The Young and the Restless (1997–2000, 2002, 2004, 2014) and as Donna Logan on The Bold and the Beautiful (2006–).

Early life
Gareis was born in Lancaster, Pennsylvania, and graduated from J. P. McCaskey High School in 1988. She graduated from Franklin and Marshall College in 1993 with a Bachelor of Science degree in accounting, then earned a Master's of Business Administration degree from Pepperdine University. She is of part Italian descent. Her great-grandmother Sebastiana Tringali came from Militello in Val di Catania, and the city gave her the honorary citizenship.

Career
Gareis competed in her first beauty pageant in 1992 when she placed second runner-up at Miss Pennsylvania USA. She later competed in New York, winning the Miss New York USA 1994 title, and representing New York in the Miss USA 1994 pageant held in South Padre Island, Texas on February 11, 1994. Gareis placed in the top six of the nationally televised pageant, which was won by Lu Parker of South Carolina.

Gareis later began an acting career and landed the role of Grace Turner on CBS soap opera The Young and the Restless, which she played from 1997 to 2000 and again in 2001, 2002, 2004 and 2014. She is best known for her current role as Donna Logan on The Bold and the Beautiful, a role she has played intermittently since July 2006.
She was ranked #90 on the Maxim Hot 100 Women of 2002.

Personal life
Gareis married Bobby Ghassemieh on March 7, 2010. On June 11, 2010, Gareis gave birth to a son, Gavin Blaze Gareis Ghassemieh. Daughter Sophia Rose Gareis Ghassemieh was born June 29, 2012.

Filmography

References

External links
 
 

1970 births
Actresses from Pennsylvania
American film actresses
American television actresses
Franklin & Marshall College alumni
Living people
Miss USA 1994 delegates
Actors from Lancaster, Pennsylvania
American soap opera actresses
American people of Italian descent
20th-century American people
21st-century American women